Roller Derby of Central Kentucky (ROCK) is a women's flat track roller derby league based in Lexington, Kentucky. Founded in 2006, the league consists of a single team, which competes against teams from other leagues, with an associated junior roller derby team. Roller Derby of Central Kentucky is a member of the Women's Flat Track Derby Association (WFTDA).

History
ROCK briefly merged with a league based in Richmond, Kentucky, but this was dissolved in late 2007, ROCK re-establishing an independent existence. It played its first exhibition game in December, and started its first full season in 2008.  At the time, it had two intraleague teams, the Bourbon Brawlers and Sour Scouts, although these were later dissolved.  By 2012, the league was playing an 11-game season, competing against leagues such as the Black-n-Bluegrass Rollergirls.

Central Kentucky was accepted as a member of the Women's Flat Track Derby Association Apprentice Program in January 2012, and it became a full WFTDA member in September 2013.

WFTDA rankings

References

Roller derby leagues established in 2006
Roller derby leagues in Kentucky
Sports in Lexington, Kentucky
Women's Flat Track Derby Association Division 3
2006 establishments in Kentucky